ABC3 may refer to:

 The former name of Australian children's free-to-air television channel ABC Me, used from 2009 to 2016.

 The former frequency of ABC Canberra until 1996 to accommodate FM radio.

ABC 3 may also refer to television stations in the United States affiliated with the American Broadcasting Company:

KATC (TV), Lafayette, Louisiana
KESQ-TV, Palm Springs, California (cable channel, broadcasts on channel 42)
KEYT-TV, Santa Barbara, California
KIII-TV, Corpus Christi, Texas
KOTA-TV, Rapid City, South Dakota
KTBS-TV, Shreveport, Louisiana
KTVO, Kirksville, Missouri/Ottumwa, Iowa
WEAR-TV, Pensacola, Florida/Mobile, Alabama
WHSV-TV, Harrisonburg, Virginia
WSIL-TV, Harrisburg, Illinois (Paducah, KY/Cape Girardeau, MO)
WWAY, Wilmington, North Carolina

Former
KOFT, Farmington, New Mexico (2002 to 2007)
Was a re-broadcast of KOAT-TV in Albuquerque
KOTA-TV (now KHME), Rapid City, South Dakota (1955–2016)
KTVK, Phoenix, Arizona (1955 to 1995)
KYUS-TV; Miles City, Montana (1987 to 1996)
WJMN-TV, Escanaba, Michigan (1983 to 1992)
Semi-satellite of WFRV-TV in Green Bay, Wisconsin
WLAJ, Lansing, Michigan (broadcasts on channel 53; former cable channel branding as ABC 3 used from 2007 to 2013)